Richlin Security Service Co. v. Chertoff, 553 U.S. 571 (2008), was a case in which the Supreme Court of the United States evaluated standards for awarding attorney's fees under the Equal Access to Justice Act. After it prevailed in a lawsuit for back wages, Richlin filed an application for reimbursement of fees and expenses from the lawsuit, including 523.8 hours of paralegal work. Richlin requested the paralegal fees at the market rate for the services, rather than at the cost to the law firm that represented Richlin. The Department of Transportation’s Board of Contract Appeals ruled that recovery of fees should be limited to the cost to the attorneys, and the United States Court of Appeals for the Federal Circuit affirmed the Board's determination. In an opinion written by Justice Samuel Alito, the Court held that parties are entitled to reimbursement for services at prevailing market rates.

See also
 List of United States Supreme Court cases
 Lists of United States Supreme Court cases by volume
 List of United States Supreme Court cases, volume 553
 List of United States Supreme Court cases by the Roberts Court

References

External links
 

2008 in United States case law
United States Supreme Court cases
United States Supreme Court cases of the Roberts Court